Shaheeya Peak is located in the Livingston Range, Glacier National Park in the U.S. state of Montana.  Shaheeya Lake is just east of the peak and Wahseeja Lake is to the northwest.

See also
 List of mountains and mountain ranges of Glacier National Park (U.S.)

References

Livingston Range
Mountains of Glacier County, Montana
Mountains of Glacier National Park (U.S.)
Mountains of Montana